Royal Air Force Sydenham or more simply RAF Sydenham is a former Royal Air Force station in Northern Ireland. In the 1970s it was the main servicing base for Blackburn Buccaneer aircraft, employing 650 civilian workers.

History

The following units were posted here at some point:

Royal Air Force
 No. 88 Squadron RAF
 No. 226 Squadron RAF
Units
 No. 3 Civilian Fighter Control Co-operation Unit RAF (March 1957 – June 1958)
 Detachment of No. 6 Anti-Aircraft Co-operation Unit RAF (1943)
 No. 8 Ferry Pilots Pool ATA (March 1941 – May 1942) became No. 8 Ferry Pool ATA (May 1942 – August 1945)
 No. 13 Air Experience Flight RAF
 No. 23 Elementary and Reserve Flying Training School RAF (September 1939)
 No. 24 Elementary and Reserve Flying Training School RAF (January – September 1939) became No. 24 Elementary Flying Training School RAF (September 1939 – February 1942)
 No. 75 (Bomber) Wing RAF (June 1940 & February – April 1941) became No. 31 Wing RAF (April – June 1941)
 No. 79 Wing Calibration Flight RAF
 No. 203 Gliding School RAF (September 1949 – November 1952)
 Detachment of No. 1480 (Anti-Aircraft Co-operation) Flight RAF (September 1942)
 No. 1494 (Target Towing) Flight RAF (April 1942 – April 1943)
 Belfast University Air Squadron (January – May 1941) became Queens University Air Squadron (May 1941 – December 1945 & March 1947 – January 1992)
 RAF Northern Ireland Communication Flight RAF (October 1940 – October 1942 & December 1945 – December 1946)

Current use

The site is now George Best Belfast City Airport.

References

Citations

Bibliography

External links
 Northern Ireland base closes, Flight International, 15 April 1978, v. 113, no. 3604, p. 1035.

Sydenham